D. J. Johnson may refer to:
D. J. Johnson (basketball) (born 1993), professional basketball player
D. J. Johnson (cornerback, born 1966), American football player
D. J. Johnson (cornerback, born 1985), American football player
D. J. Johnson (linebacker) (born 1998), American football player
DJ Johnson (baseball) (born 1989), baseball player
DJ Johnson (politician), American politician